Aleksandr Pavlovich Komissarov (born August 26, 1950) is a Russian professional football coach. As of 2009, he manages an Amateur Football League team FC Stroitel Penza.

External links
 Career summary by KLISF

1950 births
Living people
Soviet footballers
Soviet football managers
Russian football managers
FC Mordovia Saransk players
Association football goalkeepers